Jorge Amado Nunes Infrán (born 18 October 1961) is a Paraguayan football manager and former player. He played as a midfielder and has been a member of the Paraguay national team.

Club career
Nicknamed "El Cenizo", Nunes played in several teams in his career such as Libertad, Cerro Porteño, Vélez Sársfield, Deportivo Cali, Universitario de Deportes and Elche CF. Nunes spent his best years as a footballer in Deportivo Cali and Universitario of Peru, where he is considered one of the most emblematic players in their history.

International career
Born in Argentina to Paraguayan parents, Nunes has dual citizenship. He was part of the Paraguay national football team that competed in the 1986 World Cup in Mexico.

Managerial career
In his coaching career, Nunes worked with several Colombian teams such as Deportivo Cali, América de Cali and Millonarios. He was the assistant coach of José Hernández, who was in charge of the Panama national football team during the 2006 World Cup qualification. He also coached Universitario de Deportes in the season 2006/2007 terminating his contract by mutual agreement with the chairmen on 15 February 2007.  "Crema" fans will always remember him as one of the best players the club ever had.

References

External links
Homanage
rsssf

1961 births
Living people
Citizens of Paraguay through descent
Paraguayan footballers
Association football midfielders
Cerro Porteño players
Deportivo Cali footballers
Elche CF players
Club Libertad footballers
Club Universitario de Deportes footballers
Paraguayan Primera División players
Categoría Primera A players
Segunda División players
Paraguay international footballers
1986 FIFA World Cup players
1987 Copa América players
Paraguayan expatriate footballers
Paraguayan expatriate sportspeople in Colombia
Expatriate footballers in Colombia
Paraguayan expatriate sportspeople in Spain
Expatriate footballers in Spain
Paraguayan expatriate sportspeople in Peru
Expatriate footballers in Peru
Paraguayan football managers
Deportivo Cali managers
América de Cali managers
Millonarios F.C. managers
Club Universitario de Deportes managers
Paraguayan expatriate football managers
Expatriate football managers in Colombia
Expatriate football managers in Peru
People from Berazategui Partido
Argentine footballers
Club Atlético Vélez Sarsfield footballers
Argentine Primera División players
Argentine expatriate footballers
Argentine expatriate sportspeople in Colombia
Argentine expatriate sportspeople in Spain
Argentine expatriate sportspeople in Peru
Argentine football managers
Argentine expatriate football managers
Argentine sportspeople of Paraguayan descent
Argentine emigrants to Paraguay
Sportspeople from Buenos Aires Province
Sport Áncash managers